Sonora Pass (el. 9,624 ft. / 2,933 m.) is a mountain pass in the Sierra Nevada in California. It is the second-highest in California and in the Sierra Nevada. lower by 321 ft. (about 98 m.) than Tioga Pass to the south. State Route 108 traverses the pass, as does the Pacific Crest Trail.

Description
The pass connects the communities of Sonora to the west and Bridgeport to the east. Like Ebbetts Pass to the north and Tioga Pass to the south, the highway closes during winter, generally between November and May, due to snow accumulation.

The highway over the pass is extremely steep (exceeding 8% for most of the traverse, and up to 26% grades in some locations), narrow and winding between Kennedy Meadows on the west side and Leavitt Meadows on the east. The route is not recommended for vehicles or vehicle combinations that are unusually wide, heavy or long.

 The Pacific Crest Trail, a 2,650 mile (4,240 km) long National Scenic Trail, crosses Highway 108 at Sonora Pass.

Adjacent to the Pass is a picnic/parking area, which serves as a day-use rest stop or a trailhead for hikes to nearby Sonora Peak, Wolf Creek Lake, and other spots north or south along the Pacific Crest Trail.

History 
The first documented immigrant traverse of Sonora Pass appears to have been in the late summer of 1852 by a wagon train known as the Clark-Skidmore Company. Subsequently, merchant interests in the communities of Sonora and Columbia promoted the route to California-bound immigrants, not always with happy results when immigrants discovered how difficult it was. There are some references indicating the earliest immigrant crossing was in 1841 by the Bartleson-Bidwell Party, but the U.S. Forest Service indicates they crossed north of Sonora Pass in the Carson-Iceberg area.

With the discovery of deposits and development of silver and gold mining east of the Sierra Nevada in the beginning of the 1860s, merchant interests in the counties on both sides of the pass pushed for development of a road that would enable them to improve transportation and trade. Surveying for a road through Sonora Pass began in 1863 and the road was in use by 1865.

In the 1880s the California and Nevada Railroad and its predecessor, the California and Mount Diablo Railroad, proposed to run a narrow gauge railroad over Sonora Pass with a line running from Emeryville - Stockton and then connecting with the Denver and Rio Grande Railroad in Utah.  The railroad never built track beyond the San Francisco Bay Area.

The Baker Highway Maintenance Station, on 108 to the west of the summit, kept the road open during the summer; it is closed in the winter, and is listed on the National Register of Historic Places.

In popular media

In 1935, MGM Art Director David Townsend (art director) was killed when the car he was riding in left the road at Sonora Pass. Lowell L. Ralph, Mrs. Lottie Mundello, and Miss Agnes McMullen   survived after being thrown from the car. They were there scouting filming locations for the upcoming film Robin Hood of El Dorado (film).

In 1943, the location scenes for the mountainous hideout of the Republican Spanish guerilla band in For Whom the Bell Tolls were filmed here.

Climate

According to the Köppen Climate Classification system, Sonora Pass has a dry-summer subarctic climate, abbreviated "Dsc" on climate maps.

References 

Landforms of Mono County, California
Mountain passes of the Sierra Nevada (United States)
Transportation in Tuolumne County, California
Landforms of Tuolumne County, California
Transportation in Mono County, California